Electoral district no. 10 was one of the multi-member electoral districts of the Riigikogu, the national legislature of Estonia. The district was established in 1992 when the Riigikogu was re-established following Estonia's independence from the Soviet Union. It was abolished in 1995. It was conterminous with the county of Tartu.

Election results

Detailed

1992
Results of the 1992 parliamentary election held on 20 September 1992:

The following candidates were elected:
 Personal mandates - Rein Järlik (R*), 5,220 votes; and Enn Tarto (I), 9,195 votes.
 District mandates - Kaarel Jaak Roosaare (ERSP), 947 votes; Tiit Sinissaar (I), 784 votes; and Lauri Vahtre (I), 3,490 votes.
 Compensatory mandates - Liia Hänni (M), 2,672 votes; Mati Hint (R), 1,298 votes; Kalle Jürgenson (I), 299 votes; Jaan Kaplinski (R), 1,317 votes; Kalle Kulbok (SK), 878 votes; Lembit Küüts (SK), 75 votes; Peeter Lorents (KK), 212 votes; Viktor Niitsoo (ERSP), 886 votes; Mart-Olav Niklus (EK), 1,826 votes; and Mihkel Pärnoja (M), 254 votes.

References

10
10
10
Riigikogu electoral district, 10